Dorothy "Dottie" Alexander is the former keyboardist for of Montreal, an American indie pop band formed in Athens, Georgia and fronted by Kevin Barnes.

Biography
Dottie received her bachelor's degree at the University of Georgia at Athens.  Prior to moving to Athens, Dottie graduated from Westover Senior High School in Fayetteville, North Carolina in 1990.

On July 26, 2009, long-time boyfriend and of Montreal video editor and stage performer Nick Gould proposed during an of Montreal show at the Hollywood Bowl. The wedding took place in May 2010.

Projects
Prior to joining , Dottie was in a local Athens, Georgia band with James Huggins III called Lightning Bug vs. Firefly. Both Dottie and James joined of Montreal in 1998.

In 1997, Dottie contributed to Kindercore's first Christmas in Stereo album under the My First Keyboard moniker. Three songs were recorded in the late nineties, and one of them would eventually be released on Montreal's compilation "Horse & Elephant Eatery (No Elephants Allowed).

In October 2009, Dottie toured with James Husband in support of his first official release, "A Parallax I".

References

External links
 Dottie Alexander at Myspace
 Of Montreal's official site

American alternative rock musicians
American rock keyboardists
Living people
Of Montreal members
1972 births
University of Georgia alumni
Musicians from Fayetteville, North Carolina
Alternative rock keyboardists
21st-century American keyboardists
20th-century American keyboardists